United States Oval Historic District is a national historic district located on Plattsburgh Air Force Base at Plattsburgh in Clinton County, New York. The district includes 26 contributing buildings and one contributing structure. The district consists of post headquarters, barracks, officers' quarters, a hospital, a chapel, and various buildings surrounding a broad parade ground.  All were built between 1893 and 1934 by the U.S. Army as components of the former Plattsburgh Barracks.

It was added to the National Register of Historic Places in 1989.

References

Military facilities on the National Register of Historic Places in New York (state)
Historic districts on the National Register of Historic Places in New York (state)
Historic districts in Clinton County, New York
National Register of Historic Places in Clinton County, New York